GSF may refer to:

 Gamlakarleby Segelförening, a Finnish yacht club
 Generic sensor format, used for storing bathymetry data
 Genoa Social Forum
 Georgia Southern and Florida Railway
 Glasgow Science Festival
 Global Sanitation Fund
 GlobalSantaFe Corporation, a defunct American offshore oil and gas company
 Global Strategy Forum
 Golden State Foods, an American food service company
 GoSports Foundation
 Grand slam force, in contract bridge
 Grieg Seafood, a Norwegian seafood company
 Suzuki Bandit series, a series of motorcycles